Prisoners of the Storm is a 1926 American silent Western film directed by Lynn Reynolds and starring House Peters, Peggy Montgomery and Walter McGrail.

Cast
 House Peters as 'Bucky' Malone 
 Peggy Montgomery as Joan Le Grande 
 Walter McGrail as Sergeant McClellan 
 Harry Todd as Pete Le Grande 
 Fred DeSilva as Dr. Chambers 
 Clark Comstock as Angus McLynn 
 Evelyn Selbie as Lillian Nicholson

References

Bibliography
 Goble, Alan. The Complete Index to Literary Sources in Film. Walter de Gruyter, 1999.

External links
 

1926 films
1926 Western (genre) films
American black-and-white films
Films based on works by James Oliver Curwood
Films directed by Lynn Reynolds
Northern (genre) films
Silent American Western (genre) films
Universal Pictures films
1920s English-language films
1920s American films